The third government in the French Mandate for Lebanon was formed on 5 January 1928, headed by Bechara El Khoury for the second time. It won the confidence of the parliament with a majority of 33 votes. On 10 August, the Prime Minister resigned again.

Composition

References 

Cabinets disestablished in 1928
Cabinets established in 1928
Cabinets of Lebanon